Senator Sampson may refer to:

Ezekiel S. Sampson (1831–1896), Iowa State Senate
John L. Sampson (born 1965), New York State Senate